Baladiyah Al-Batʼha, also known by its English name Al-Batʼha Sub-Municipality, is an urban baladiyah and one of the 16 sub-municipalities of Riyadh, Saudi Arabia, which includes neighbourhoods of al-Manfuhah, ad-Dirah, al-Mansourah, al-Khalidiyyah and parts of Sinaiyah Qadeem. Apart from being a historic flea market, the locality is also well known for hosting a large population of Bangladeshi migrant workers, besides having significant presence of Indians, Pakistanis, Filipinos and Sri Lankans who altogether dominate around 70% of the economic activity in the downtown. It was made into a municipal division (baladiyah) in 1977 during the reign of King Khalid in order to have a better administration over the area.

Neighbourhoods and sub-districts
Baladiyah al-Batha consists of several neighbourhoods and sub-districts, which are:

 al-Dubiyah
 Mikal
 Jabrah
 al-Manfuhah
 Manfuhah al-Jadidah
 al-Yamamah
 Sinaiyah Qadeem (partially)
Al Bateha
 Ghubaira
 al-Khalidiyyah
 al-Salhiyah
 al-Marqab
 al-Qiri
 al-Wusaita
 al-Faisaliyyah
 al-Mansourah (partially)
 al-Salam
 Utaiqah
 ad-Dirah
 Al Oud
 Skirinah

References

Batha

Economy of Riyadh
Shopping districts and streets